The String Quartet No. 4, Op. 22 by Paul Hindemith was written in 1921 and published in 1923. A performance of the work takes about 26 minutes.

Structure 
The quartet is for two violins, viola and cello and is in 5 movements:

References

External links 
 

Compositions by Paul Hindemith